United Nations Security Council resolution 2111 was adopted in 2013.

The resolution mandates the group monitoring sanctions imposed on Somalia, explicitly targeting parties that obstructed justice while further easing funding and equipment restrictions on the United Nations and European Union missions in that country.

See also
 List of United Nations Security Council Resolutions 2101 to 2200 (2013–2015)

References

External links
Text of the Resolution at undocs.org

2013 United Nations Security Council resolutions
July 2013 events